The list of Expressways in Tehran as of the middle of 2013.

East–west
Ahang Expressway
Allameh Jafari Expressway
Babayi Expressway
Besat Expressway
Fath Expressway
Hakim Expressway
Hemmat Expressway
Iranpars Expressway
Jalal-e-Ale Ahmad Expressway
Mahallati Expressway
Hashemi Rafsanjani Expressway
Resalat Expressway
Sadr Expressway
Zeinoddin Expressway

North–south
Ashrafi Esfahani Expressway
Bagheri Expressway
Bakeri Expressway
Basij Expressway
Chamran Expressway
Imam Ali Expressway
Kordestan Expressway
Modares Expressway
Mohammad Ali Jenah Expressway
Navvab Expressway
Saidi Expressway
Sayyad Expressway
Shahid Sattari Expressway
Tondguyan Expressway
Yadegar-e-Emam Expressway

Other
Azadegan Expressway
Ayatollah Kashani Expressway
Behesht-e Zahra Expressway
Doran Expressway
Kazemi Expressway
Northern Behesht-e Zahra Expressway
Javaneh Expressway
Qale Morghi Expressway
Shahid Gomnam Expressway
Shahid Haghani Expressway
Sheikh Fazl-allah Nouri Expressway
Yasini Expressway

Transport in Tehran
expressway